North India Institute of Post Graduate Theological Studies (NIIPGTS) is an academic institution of higher learning promoted by the Bishop’s College, Calcutta and the Serampore College, Serampore comprising faculty from both the institutions affiliated to the nation's first University, the Senate of Serampore College (University).

The NIIPGTS was started in 1980 to offer postgraduate courses under the Senate of Serampore College (University) with select specialisations.  In 1998, the Institute started offering specialisation in Missiology.  In 1999, the NIPPGTS was recognised as an institution offering doctoral-level courses by the Senate of Serampore College (University).

Further reading

References

Seminaries and theological colleges in India
Universities and colleges in Kolkata
Educational institutions established in 1980
Reformed church seminaries and theological colleges
Anglican seminaries and theological colleges
Christian seminaries and theological colleges in India
 
Seminaries and theological colleges affiliated to the Senate of Serampore College (University)
Academic staff of the Senate of Serampore College (University)